Sal Cintorino (born c. 1961) is an American football coach.  He is the head football coach at Avon High School in Avon, Connecticut, a position he has held since 2016.  Cintorino was the ninth head football coach at Central Connecticut State University in New Britain, Connecticut, serving for nine seasons, from 1992 to 2000, and compiling a record of 33–56.

Head coaching record

College

References

1960s births
Year of birth missing (living people)
Living people
American football linebackers
Central Connecticut Blue Devils football coaches
Central Connecticut Blue Devils football players
High school football coaches in Connecticut